Witham Hall is an independent boarding and day school situated in Witham on the Hill, Lincolnshire, England.

The hall
The house is described by Sir Nikolaus Pevsner in Buildings of England. The core of the house, consisting of five bays between the east front and the west front, dates from 1752 to 1756, although its style, especially its moulded window surrounds, is characteristic of the earlier 18th century. No features from the Georgian Period remain inside. The exterior was redeveloped, between 1903 and 1905, by Andrew Noble Prentice, who created an H-shaped plan for the house and added a range on the east side. Along the drive, stretching from the west side of the house to the main entrance, is a sequence of three pseudo-Jacobean arches, dating from 1876, 1830, and 1906, respectively. The hall and its arches are Grade II listed buildings.

The stable block was converted to a music school in 1979 by Rex Critchlow.

The school
Witham Hall opened as a preparatory school in 1959. Witham Hall School is a feeder school for public schools. It was described in 2014 as  'a first-rate establishment – almost worth having another baby for’ by one parent.

Peter Stanley Lyons was headmaster, 1961–1989.

Notable alumni
 Joshua Leakey VC
 Fergus Cochrane-Dyet British High Commissioner to Malawi

References

External links
School Website
Profile on the ISC website

Boarding schools in Lincolnshire
Preparatory schools in Lincolnshire
Educational institutions established in 1959
1959 establishments in England